La Vota Lake is a lake in Gizzeria, Province of Catanzaro, Calabria, Italy.

Lakes of Calabria